Henry Heath may refer to:

 Henry Heath (British Army officer) (1860–1915), First World War commander
 Henry Heath (martyr) (1599–1643), Franciscan friar
 Henry Heath (Mormon pioneer) (1828–1908), Mormon pioneer and frontier lawman

See also
 Henry Heth (1825–1899), Confederate general